The 2020 Baltic Cup was the 28th Baltic Cup, an international football tournament contested by the Baltic states. Originally scheduled to be held in the summer 2020, the tournament was postponed due to the COVID-19 pandemic and rescheduled for 1 to 10 June 2021, while retaining the name 2020 Baltic Cup. Estonia won their fourth title, and their first since 1938.

Standings

Matches

Lithuania vs. Estonia

Latvia vs. Lithuania

Estonia vs. Latvia

Winners

Statistics

Goalscorers

References

2020
2021 in Estonian football
2021 in Latvian football
2021 in Lithuanian football
Association football events postponed due to the COVID-19 pandemic
June 2021 sports events in Europe